Please Teacher is a 1937 British comedy film, based on a musical play by KRG Browne, Bert Lee and RP Weston. This was adapted into a screenplay by Stafford Dickens, who also directed.

Plot
On his 30th birthday, unemployed rogue Tommy Deacon (Bobby Howes) inherits his aunt's fortune, but is informed it has been hidden in a bust of Napoleon in a country house he has also inherited. On discovering the house is now an Academy for Young Ladies, Tommy pretends to be the brother of Anne (René Ray), one of the girls, in order to gain admittance.

Cast
Tommy Deacon - 	Bobby Howes
Petunia Trundle - 	Vera Pearce
Ann Trent - 	René Ray
Round - 	Arthur Chesney
Oswald Clutterbuck - 	Wylie Watson
Agatha Pink - 	Bertha Belmore
Wing Foo - 	Lyn Harding
Reeves	- Aubrey Dexter

Critical reception
In 1937, The Sydney Morning Herald wrote, "Although a little slow in getting in to their stride, because of the sluggish opening of the story, the actors manage to vitalise a feeble plot with enough comical characterisation to make it acceptable as average entertainment."

References

External links
 

1937 films
Films shot at Associated British Studios
British black-and-white films
British comedy films
1937 comedy films
1930s British films